Lluís Puig i Gordi (Terrassa, 18 October 1959) is an art director, dancer, musician, folklorist and Spanish politician from Catalonia. He was Minister of Culture of Catalonia, the department in charge of the libraries, language and heritage preservation, historical commemorations... He succeeded Santi Vila on 5 July 2017.

Biography 

Born in Terrassa in 1959 he studied music, dance, audiovisual production and humanities from the Open University of Catalonia. Immediately after finishing his studies he devoted himself to the study, promotion and practice of Catalan traditions.

He has been a sardanist in the group Minyons d'en Serrat, Asert. He was also a dancer and director of several traditional dancing clubs from different cities: Terrassa, Catalunya Dansa, Igualada, Barcelona, and Rubí. Additionally, he was part of the folk group Ministrils del Raval, and founder of several cultural associations from Terrassa. As a recognition to his efforts the Government of Catalonia granted him the National Dance Award in 1984.

From 1998 to 2000 he was the head of resources of the Center for the Promotion of Popular and Traditional Catalan Culture. From 1999 to 2010 he was the director of the Fira Mediterrania in Manresa. In 2001 he was a cofounder of the company VESC (Vèrtex Empresarial de Serveis Culturals, SL) dedicated to popularize Catalan songs, music and dance and other traditional Mediterranean cultures. In 2005 he promoted the project Casa de la Música in Terrassa, Salt, Mataró, l'Hospitalet de Llobregat, and Manresa. This project aimed to encourage the general public to study, create and play all kinds of live music.

Starting in 2008, Puig would be the director of the  during three editions. During this period he managed to invite popular groups and artists like: Mishima, Santiago Auserón, Roger Mas, Omar Sosa, La Gossa Sorda, At Versaris, Els Surfing Sirles...

During the first mandate of Artur Mas i Gavarro, Puig joined the political party Convergence and Union and assumed the position of general director of Popular Culture in 2011, until he was designated Minister of Culture of Catalonia on 5 July 2017.

After the 2017 Catalan independence referendum, the Spanish authorities brought criminal charges against a number of members of the Catalan government, including Puig. Together with some of the other Catalan politicians who were prosecuted, he fled to Belgium at the end of 2017. In August 2020, a court in Brussels, Belgium ruled that a European Arrest Warrant, issued against Puig by Spanish authorities, could not be executed.

Bibliography 
In addition to his career as cultural promoter, he has also written or cowritten several books about traditional culture, especially dance:
 Terregada. Apunts sobre folklore de Terrassa (1991)
 Crònica i calendari de dansa tradicional (1994)
 Danses de la Terra de la Biblioteca Joan Amades (1998)
 Calendari de danses tradicionals catalanes (1998)
 Les festes a Catalunya (1999)

See also 
 Joan Amades
 Joaquim Forn
 Carles Puigdemont

References

External links 

 Youtube video of the Government of Catalonia: Lluís Puig takeover as a new Minister of Culture of Catalonia 
 El Nacional article: Lluís Puig, el folklore rescatat 

Living people
People from Terrassa
Convergence and Union politicians
Spanish art directors
1959 births
Exiled politicians from Catalonia
Culture ministers of Catalonia
Members of the 12th Parliament of Catalonia
People barred from public office